The following is a list of events affecting Canadian television in 1976. Events listed include television show debuts, finales, cancellations, and channel launches.

Events

Debuts

Ending this year

Television shows

1950s
Country Canada (1954–2007)
CBC News Magazine (1952–1981)
Circle 8 Ranch (1955–1978)
The Friendly Giant (1958–1985)
Hockey Night in Canada (1952–present)
The National (1954–present)
Front Page Challenge (1957–1995)
Wayne and Shuster Show (1958–1989)

1960s
CTV National News (1961–present)
Land and Sea (1964–present)
Man Alive (1967–2000)
Mr. Dressup (1967–1996)
The Nature of Things (1960–present, scientific documentary series)
The Pig and Whistle (1967–1977)
Question Period (1967–present, news program)
Reach for the Top (1961–1985)
Take 30 (1962–1983)
The Tommy Hunter Show (1965–1992)
University of the Air (1966–1983)
W-FIVE (1966–present, newsmagazine program)

1970s
The Beachcombers (1972–1990)
The Bobby Vinton Show (1975–1978)
Canada AM (1972–present, news program)
City Lights (1973–1989)
Celebrity Cooks (1975–1984)
Coming Up Rosie (1975–1978)
Definition (1974–1989)
the fifth estate (1975–present, newsmagazine program)
Grand Old Country (1975–1981)
Headline Hunters (1972–1983)
Howie Meeker's Hockey School (1973–1977)
King of Kensington (1975–1980)
Marketplace (1972–present, newsmagazine program)
Ombudsman (1974–1980)
Sidestreet (1975–1978)
This Land (1970–1982)
V.I.P. (1973–1983)
The Watson Report (1975–1981)

TV movies
The Insurance Man from Ingersoll
Kathy Karuks Is a Grizzly Bear
A Nest of Shadows
Of the Fields, Lately
A Thousand Moons
What We Have Here Is a People Problem

Television stations

Debuts

See also
 1976 in Canada
 List of Canadian films

References